NSP may refer to:

Companies and organizations
 Afghan National Solidarity Programme, an initiative to develop villages in Afghanistan
 National Ski Patrol, a rescue organization in ski areas in the United States
 National Solidarity Party (Singapore)
 Nature's Sunshine Products, US health supplement manufacturer
 Nebraska State Patrol
 Network of Spiritual Progressives, US political movement
 New Sarum Police, former name for the Salisbury City Police in the 1830s
 Nevada State Prison
 Nordic Service Partners, fast food franchisee
 Northern States Power Company, a division of Xcel Energy
 Nova Scotia Power, Canada
 ICAO code for aircraft flown by Samaritan's Purse
 People's Freedom Movement (Narodni slobodarski pokret), a political party in Serbia

Technology
 Native Signal Processing, Intel's term for host signal processing
 Network security policy, rules for computer network access
 Network service provider, a business that provides access to the Internet
 Nvidia Shield Portable

Other uses
 Natural swimming pool, another name for a natural pool
 Needle and syringe programme, another name for Needle exchange programme, a program to reduce disease in drug users
 Netaji Subhash Place metro station
 Ninja Sex Party, an American musical comedy-rock and electronic band
 Non-starch polysaccharide, often incorrectly used interchangeably with dietary fiber
The Northern State Parkway, a parkway on the North Shore of Long Island, New York
 Nuovo Siluro Pesante, a torpedo used by the Italian Navy
 Nurse scheduling problem
 Nonstructural protein of viruses as to be found e. g. in Rotavirsues (NSP1–NSP6) and Corinaviruses (NSP1–NSP16): NSP1, NSP2, NSP3, NSP4, NSP5, NSP6. 
 Nsp is the acronym for the gene encoding a nonstructural protein (in italics: Nsp1, Nsp2...)